Syrrheonema is a genus of flowering plants belonging to the family Menispermaceae.

Its native range is Africa.

Species:

Syrrheonema fasciculatum 
Syrrheonema hexastamineum 
Syrrheonema welwitschii

References

Menispermaceae
Menispermaceae genera